Ali Askhatovich Shogentsukov (Russian: Али́ Асха́дович Шогенцу́ков, Kabardian: ЩоджэнцIыкIу Iэсхьэд и къуэ Алий; 28 October 1900, Bekhisen, Terek Oblast – 29 November 1941, Babruysk, Belarus) was a Kabardian teacher, writer and translator, and the founder of literature in the Kabardian language.

Life

He studied at the madrasa and the Pedagological Institute of Bekhisen and later in Istanbul, later on he came back to Kabardino-Balkaria, where he worked as a teacher.

In autumn 1941, he died in a Nazi concentration camp.

Works 
 Стиххэмрэ поэмэхэмрэ 1938
 Хьэжыгъэ пут закъуэ : Рассказ, 1940
 Ныбжьыщ1э хахуэ: Поэма, 1940

References and external links

1900 births
1941 deaths
Soviet writers
Kabardian-language writers
Circassian people of Russia
Soviet people who died in Nazi concentration camps
Soviet translators